Harivarman V or Prince Sundaradeva (r. 1114–1129) was a king of Champa. Jaya Indravarman II (1071–1113) ruled thirty years without an heir. Harivarman, a nephew, was appointed as king of mandala Champa. His reign was peaceful; he sent diplomatic missions to the court of the Song dynasty in 1116 and 1120. He was enfeoffed as "Grand Master of the Palace with Golden Seal and Purple Ribbon" by the Chinese court, in response.

Harivarman made several donations and buildings to the sanctuaries at My Son.

Perhaps due to lack of suitable heirs to inherit him, Harivarman nominated his adopted son the title of Devaraja in 1129, the Crown Prince in 1133. In 1139 the Crown Prince ascended the throne with regnal name Jaya Indravarman III (r. 1139–1145).

References

Bibliography
 
   

 

Kings of Champa